Reuleaux may refer to:
 Franz Reuleaux (1829–1905), German mechanical engineer and lecturer
 in geometry:
 Reuleaux polygon, a curve of constant width
 Reuleaux triangle, a Reuleaux polygon with three sides
 Reuleaux heptagon, a Reuleaux polygon with seven sides that provides the shape of some currency coins
 Reuleaux tetrahedron, the intersection of four spheres of equal radius centered at the vertices of a regular tetrahedron